Thommo Reachea II (1602–1631), also known as Ponhea To or Cau Bana Tu, was the Cambodian king who reigned from 1628 to 1631. 

Ponhea To was the eldest son of Chey Chettha II. He succeeded his father as king in 1628. At the same time, he appointed his uncle Outey as regent, assuming the title uprayorach (ឧភយោរាជ), the title usually borne by kings who had abdicated but retained executive powers.

Ponhea To was betrothed to his half-sister Ang Vathi, however, Ang Vathi later married Outey. In 1630, he fell deeply in love with Ang Vathi while on a visit to Angkor. The lovers eloped but both were killed by Outey's foreign mercenaries in Khsach Kandal.

References

 Chroniques Royales du Cambodge de 1594 à 1677. École française d'Extrême Orient. Paris 1981 
 Achille Dauphin-Meunier  Histoire du Cambodge Presses universitaires de France, Paris 1968 Que sais-je ? n° 916. 

1602 births
1631 deaths
17th-century Cambodian monarchs